The Black Swan is the fifth and final studio album by The Triffids, released in April 1989 and peaking at No. 59 on the Australian Album Charts. The album was originally conceived as a double album.

In the recording sessions the Triffids were joined by producer Stephen Street (the Smiths' - Strangeways, Here We Come and Morrissey's Viva Hate). The Black Swan used a greater variety of musical instruments than their previous albums with bouzouki, güiro and accordion and a more obvious use of synths and programming. The title of the album was originally going to be Disappointment Resort Complex but was renamed to The Black Swan, which according to a 1989 interview by Stephen Phillips (NME) with David McComb is based on the 1954 novel of the same name by Thomas Mann.

Background
The chosen single from the album, "Goodbye Little Boy", featured Jill Birt on vocals and 'glammed up' for the record sleeve.

"Too Hot To Move" was one of three songs written by David McComb which were used in the ABC TV series Sweet and Sour (1984) it had lead vocals by Deborah Conway (of Do-Ré-Mi). McComb bought back the rights to "Too Hot To Move" so that The Triffids could perform it again.

The cover photograph was taken in the stables at the rear of The Cliffe, the historic Peppermint Grove home in which David and Robert McComb grew up.

A deluxe version of the album, with a 17-track bonus disc of demos, was released in Australia on 7 June 2008 through Liberation Music.

When the album was reissued with extra tracks, "Evil" Graham Lee noted it had, "often been considered a stylistic mess but we thought it just our kind of mess. What's the matter with mess anyway? I've gone out on a limb with this one, at Dave's request. He had hoped this record could be a double album when it was recorded - he knew it was so varied that it sounded like nothing else anyone was doing at the time and he thought you shouldn't do things by halves.

Reception 

Q said, "All 13 songs develop like variations on a theme. McComb usually portrays one half of a broken relationship contemplating sober or unsober home truths about life's fallibilities from uncomfortable isolation. The musical settings are constantly stunning."

AllMusic noted, "while previous Triffids albums were never homogeneous, on The Black Swan strikingly disparate stylistic elements rub shoulders, sometimes during the same song, from opera to funk to jazz to rap and hip-hop. Frontman David McComb saw the potential of rap and hip-hop to reenergize rock's increasingly dull, uniform idiom and several numbers blend genres in modest but prescient ways."

The Guardian said, "Black Swan was intended to be the Triffids' White Album. As is the often the way with such things, it wasn't - though the band's leader, the late David McComb, certainly had no shortage of ideas on how acoustic and electronic music could be put together. (Too many ideas, in fact: half of this could be painlessly dropped.)

Track listing 
All tracks written by Dave McComb unless otherwise noted.

 "Too Hot to Move" - 4:12
 "American Sailors" - 0:41
 "Falling Over You" (David McComb, Adam Peters) - 3:43
 "Goodbye Little Boy" (David McComb, Adam Peters) - 3:28
 "Bottle of Love" (David McComb, Phil Kakulas, James Patterson) - 2:54
 "The Spinning Top Song" (David McComb, Adam Peters) - 3:36
 "Butterflies into Worms" (David McComb, Phil Kakulas) - 3:20
 "New Year's Greetings" - 5:43
 "Good Fortune Rose" (Jill Birt, Alsy MacDonald) - 3:33
 "One Mechanic Town" - 3:11
 "Blackeyed Susan" (David McComb, Phil Kakulas) - 4:02
 "The Clown Prince" (David McComb, Phil Kakulas) - 4:37
 "Fairytale Love" - 3:51

2008 Reissue 

Disc 1:
 Too Hot to Move, Too Hot to Think
 American Sailors
 Falling Over You
 Goodbye Little Boy
 Bottle of Love
 Go Home Eddie
 The Spinning Top Song
 Butterflies into Worms
 I Can't Help Falling in Love
 New Year's Greetings
 Good Fortune Rose
 Shell of the Man
 One Mechanic Town
 Jack's Hole
 Black-Eyed Susan
 You Minus Me
 The Clown Prince
 Fairytale Love
 How Could I Help But Love You

Disc 2:
 Too Hot to Move, Too Hot to Think (Demo)
 American Sailors (Demo)
 Why Don't You Leave for Good This Time (Demo)
 Bottle of Love (Demo)
 The Spinning Top Song (Demo)
 Butterflies into Worms (Demo)
 New Year's Greetings (The Country Widower) (Demo)
 Good Fortune Rose (Demo)
 One Mechanic Town (Demo)
 Jack's Hole (Demo)
 Black-Eyed Susan (Demo)
 You Minus Me (Demo)
 The Clown Prince (Demo)
 Fairytale Love (Demo)
 (You've Got) A Funny Way of Showing You Love Me (Demo)
 No More After You (Demo)
 In the Dark (Demo)

Personnel

The Triffids 
Credited to:
 David McComb
 Alsy MacDonald
 Robert McComb
 Martyn Casey
 'Evil' Graham Lee
 Jill Birt

Additional musicians 
 Adam Peters
 Philip Kakulas
 Rita Menendez

References

External links 
 
 A Retrospective with Graham Lee and Rob McComb by Wilson Neate

1989 albums
The Triffids albums
Albums produced by Stephen Street